John Avery is Belizean Public Utilities Commissioner, and was a journalist.

Life
In 2005 he became the editor of the Guardian newspaper, the chief media organ of Belize's United Democratic Party. Avery is responsible for the weekly editorial and assorted columns in the newspaper, published on Thursdays.

Avery appeared on radio on Thursday mornings to promote the newspaper and is a political commentator.

In 2008, he became Public Utilities Commissioner.
The PUC is litigating against the electric utility, Belize Electricity Limited, and telephone company, Belize Telemedia Limited.
This was controversial.

References

Living people
Year of birth missing (living people)
Belizean journalists